Ambrysus lunatus is a species of creeping water bug in the family Naucoridae. It is found in Central America and North America.

Subspecies
These two subspecies belong to the species Ambrysus lunatus:
 Ambrysus lunatus lunatus Usinger, 1946
 Ambrysus lunatus menoides La Rivers, 1953

References

Further reading

 

Articles created by Qbugbot
Insects described in 1946
Naucoridae